
Lac de Cleuson is a reservoir in the municipality of Nendaz, Valais, Switzerland. Water from the reservoir is often pumped into the Grande Dixence Dam's reservoir, Lac des Dix, for use in hydroelectricity production.

See also
List of lakes of Switzerland
List of mountain lakes of Switzerland

External links

Swiss Committee on Dams, Lac de Cleuson - https://web.archive.org/web/20100715210229/http://www.swissdams.ch/dams/damForm/default_e.asp?ID=31
Walk from Siviez to the dam of Lac de Cleuson - http://myswitzerland.flaggy.ch/nendaz/eng/cleuson-e.htm

Reservoirs in Switzerland
Lakes of Valais